The Wire of Death was a lethal electric fence created by the German military to control the Dutch–Belgian frontier after the occupation of Belgium during the First World War.

Terminology 
The name 'Wire of Death' is an English rendition of one of its popular Dutch names, which literally means "Death wire". As the war continued and more and more victims fell to the electric fence, it became known as simply  meaning "The Wire". Parallels have been made between the 'Death Wire' and the later Iron Curtain.

Construction 

As Germany invaded neutral Belgium, Belgians began to cross the border to the Netherlands en masse. In 1914 one million Belgian refugees were already in the Netherlands, but throughout the war, refugees kept coming and tried to cross the border. Many wanted to escape German occupation, others wanted to join their relatives who had already fled, and some wanted to take part in the war and chose this detour to join the forces on the Western Front.

Within  of the wire, anyone who was not able to officially explain their presence was summarily executed, although the German border guards took care not to fire into the Netherlands who were officially neutral.

Result and legacy 
The number of victims is estimated to range between 2,000 and 3,000 people. Local newspapers in the Southern Netherlands carried almost daily reports about people who were 'lightninged to death'. However, many also succeeded in overcoming the fence, often by employing dangerous or creative methods, ranging from the use of very large ladders and tunnels to pole vaulting and binding porcelain plates onto shoes in an attempt to insulate themselves.

The wire also separated families and friends as the Dutch–Belgian border where Dutch and Flemings (Dutch-speaking Belgians), despite living in different states, often intermarried or otherwise socialized with each other. Funeral processions used to walk to the fence and halt there, to give relatives and friends on the other side the opportunity to pray and say farewell. The (neutral) Dutch government, which initially didn't object, protested the wire later on several occasions after its existence caused public outrage in the Netherlands. The great number of fatalities not only resulted in a sharp increase in Dutch Anti-German sentiment (in a country which had up until then been mostly hostile to Britain due to the Second Boer War) but also made smuggling goods in the border area much more dangerous and therefore more lucrative for local smugglers.

The fence did not completely follow the border and did not cross rivers. The Germans also allowed locals to pass through for church services, on market days and during harvest. In October 1918 the Germans opened the border to allow refugees from France and Belgium through rather than clog up German lines of communication in Belgium. At the end of the war, the Kaiser crossed the border from Belgium into the neutral Netherlands to take refuge there.

Immediately after the signing of the armistice in November 1918, the power plants around the wire were shut down and locals on both sides of the border soon destroyed the much-hated fence. Today all that remains of the original wire are some warning signs; however in some areas certain stretches have been reconstructed such as near Hamont-Achel, Zondereigen, Molenbeersel and between Achtmaal and Nieuwmoer in nature reserve "De Maatjes" by observation post "De Klot".

References

Bibliography

Further reading

External links
 Dutch Public Television documentary

1910s in the Netherlands
Belgium–Netherlands border
Border barriers
Rape of Belgium